Rowlatts Hill (also known as Rowlatts Hill Estate, or R.H.E.) is an eastern, residential suburb of the English city of Leicester. It contains mostly council-owned housing.

The suburb is roughly bordered by Spencefield Lane to the east and Whitehall Road to the south, which separates it from neighbouring Evington. A second boundary within the estate consists of Coleman Road to Ambassador Road through to Green Lane Road; Rowlatts Hill borders Crown Hills to the west. To the north, at the bottom of Rowlatts Hill is Humberstone Park which is located within Green Lane Road, Ambassador Road and also leads on to Uppingham Road (the A47), which is also Rowlatts Hill.

Goodwood, a sub-area within Rowlatts Hill, is located towards the south-east of the area.

The Leicester General hospital is located near Goodwood on Coleman Road which is south of Uppingham Road (the A47).

Areas of Leicester